Spanish invasion may refer to one of the following historical invasions by Spain:
 Spanish colonization of the Americas, beginning with the 1492 arrival of Christopher Columbus and continuing for over four centuries
 Spanish invasion of Britain, a group of Jacobites and Spanish soldiers which reached Scotland and surrendered at the Battle of Glen Shiel
 Spanish invasion of Georgia, a military campaign by Spanish forces which attempted to seize and occupy disputed territory held by the British colony of Georgia
 Spanish invasion of Portugal, the principal military campaign of the Fantastic War
 Spanish invasion of New Granada, part of the Spanish American wars of independence in South America